Alexandre Hauw (born 22 January 1982 in Bourgoin-Jallieu, Isère) is a French retired footballer who played as a midfielder.

External links

1982 births
Living people
People from Bourgoin-Jallieu
Sportspeople from Isère
French footballers
Association football midfielders
Ligue 1 players
Ligue 2 players
Championnat National 2 players
Olympique Lyonnais players
FC Rouen players
Clermont Foot players
FC Gueugnon players
GOAL FC players
Primeira Liga players
Associação Naval 1º de Maio players
G.D. Estoril Praia players
French expatriate footballers
Expatriate footballers in Portugal
French expatriate sportspeople in Portugal
Footballers from Auvergne-Rhône-Alpes